The National Federation of Plantation and Agricultural Workers (FNLPA) was a plantation workers' trade union in Somalia. It was founded in 1958 and was affiliated to the Somali Confederation of Labour. FNLPA had contacts with the International Federation of Plantation, Agricultural and Allied Workers (IFPAAW). The organization had its headquarters in Merca.

References

Trade unions in Somalia
Trade unions established in 1958
Defunct trade unions of Africa
Defunct organisations based in Somalia